Serena Ortolani (born 7 January 1987 in Ravenna) is an Italian volleyball player.

Career
She has played as an opposite hitter for Foppapedretti Bergamo from 2008 to 2011. Her debut for the national team came on the 2005 edition of the European Championships, held in Croatia, when the team was then coached by Marco Bonitta. In the 2005/06 season, she won her first Coppa Italia and Scudetto with Foppapedretti Bergamo. In 2006, she was selected again for the national team for the 2006 FIVB Women's World Championship, held in Japan, where she helped Italy win fourth place. She began the 2006/2007 season for Bergamo, but after the first half of the season, she was loaned to Rebecchi Piacenza, to improve her game further. In 2007, she helped the Italian volleyball team win the Women's European Volleyball Championship, held in Belgium and Luxembourg and repeated this success a few months later at the World Cup in Japan, thereby helping Italy gain qualification for the 2008 Olympic Games in Beijing, where she subsequently competed.

She won the 2008–09 CEV Indesit Champions League playing with Volley Bergamo and was awarded "Most Valuable Player".

She was selected to play the Italian League All-Star game in 2017.

Clubs
  Teodora Ravenna (2000–2001)
  Foppapedretti Bergamo (2004–2006)
  Rebecchi Piacenza (2006–2007)
  Yamamay Busto Arsizio (2007–2008)
  Foppapedretti Bergamo (2008–2011)
  Volley Pesaro  (2011–2012)
  Yamamay Busto Arsizio  (2013–2014)
  Pomi Casalmaggiore (2014–2015)
  Imoco Conegliano (2015–2017)
  ProVictoria Pallavolo Monza (2017–present)

Awards

Individuals
 2008–09 CEV Indesit Champions League Final Four "Most Valuable Player"

Club
 2004 Italian Supercup -  Champion, with Radio 105 Foppapedretti Bergamo
 2004–05 CEV Champions League -  Champion, with Radio 105 Foppapedretti Bergamo
 2005-06 Italian Championship -  Champion, with Radio 105 Foppapedretti Bergamo
 2005-06 Italian Cup (Coppa Italia) -  Champion, with Radio 105 Foppapedretti Bergamo
 2008–09 CEV Champions League -  Champion, with Foppapedretti Bergamo
 2009–10 CEV Champions League -  Champion, with Foppapedretti Bergamo
 2010–11 Italian League -  Champion, with Norda Foppapedretti Bergamo
 2014–15 Italian League -  Champion, with Pomì Casalmaggiore
 2015–16 Italian League -  Champion, with Imoco Volley Conegliano
 2016 Italian Supercup -  Champions, with Imoco Volley Conegliano
 2016-17 Italian Cup (Coppa Italia) -  Champions, with Imoco Volley Conegliano
 2016–17 CEV Champions League -  Runner-Up, with Imoco Volley Conegliano
 2018–19 CEV Challenge Cup -  Champion, with ProVictoria Pallavolo Monza

National team
2007 World Cup
2007 European Championships
2005 European Championships

National youth team
2004 Junior European Championships

References

External links
 Official website
 Italian League Profile

1987 births
Living people
Sportspeople from Ravenna
Olympic volleyball players of Italy
Italian women's volleyball players
Volleyball players at the 2008 Summer Olympics
Volleyball players at the 2016 Summer Olympics
Universiade medalists in volleyball
Universiade gold medalists for Italy
Medalists at the 2009 Summer Universiade
21st-century Italian women